Romulo "Kid" Valderama Peña Jr. (born August 5, 1969) is a Filipino politician and the current Representative of the 1st District of Makati in the Philippine House of Representatives. He previously served as acting Makati Mayor from 2015 to 2016 after the office of Ombudsman of the Philippines dismissed Jejomar Erwin "Junjun" Binay, Jr. over contract irregularities related to the construction of Makati City Science High School. Prior to that, he served as Vice Mayor of Makati from 2010 to 2015 and a barangay kagawad and captain of Barangay Valenzuela.

Personal life 
Romulo Peña Jr. was once a service crew member, rider, and manager for several fast food restaurants. His humble beginnings among the streets and masses have been attributed to his success and relevance in the local politics of Makati.

He is an avid motorcycle rider and the founder of a community-based group named "Tropang Kid". Since its formation in 1994, the riding club has established itself as a growing organization in Makati composed of volunteers who travel around in motorbikes as companions of the District Representative and as social service carriers.

He graduated from Adamson University with the degree of Bachelor of Arts in Political Science in 1990, as well as a degree holder of Economics from De La Salle University.

Political career 
He started his career in politics when he volunteered as a youth leader before being elected as Councilor and Chairman of Barangay Valenzuela, Makati. He later became President of the Association of Barangay Captains (ABC), a Sectoral Representative in the City Council, from 2007 to 2010.

In the May 2010 elections, he was elected as vice-mayor where he ran as an independent candidate and the running mate of outgoing Vice Mayor Ernesto Mercado. He was re-elected in 2013 under the Liberal Party (LP).

Peña was sworn in as acting mayor of Makati at the old city hall building after the Office of the Ombudsman suspended Mayor Jejomar Erwin "Junjun" Binay Jr. and 14 individuals over irregularities on building contracts. He became the first city mayor of Makati not affiliated with the Binay family since 1986 and its cityhood in 1995. However, he lost the 2016 election to Abigail Binay.

In the 2019 Philippine midterm elections, Peña made a successful political comeback, defeating former Philippine Vice President Jejomar Binay in a close race for a congressional seat in the 1st district of Makati.

References 

|-

|-

1969 births
Living people
Members of the House of Representatives of the Philippines from Makati
Mayors of Makati
De La Salle University alumni
Adamson University alumni
Liberal Party (Philippines) politicians
People from Makati